Yves Benoist is a French mathematician, known for his work on group dynamics on homogeneous spaces. He is currently a Senior Researcher (Directeur de Recherche) of CNRS at the University of Paris-Sud.

In 1990 Benoist proved a longstanding open conjecture with Patrick Foulon and François Labourie about Anosov flows on compact, negatively curved manifolds. In the 2000s he wrote a series of papers on the divisible convex sets in projective space and periodic tilings by such sets.

In 2011 he was awarded the Clay Research Award along with his former doctoral student, Jean-François Quint. The prize citation highlighted their work on stationary measures and closed orbits for non-abelian group actions on homogeneous spaces, solving a long-standing conjecture of Hillel Furstenberg. They showed that in homogeneous spaces of finite volume, orbits of a Zariski dense subgroup of a semisimple group equidistribute towards algebraic measures.

He gave the 2012 Takagi Lectures in Kyoto at the Research Institute for Mathematical Sciences (RIMS). In 2014 he was an Invited speaker at the International Congress of Mathematicians in Seoul.

Selected works

Lecture notes on Yves Benoist's work 
Jean-François Quint: Convexes divisibles, d'après Yves Benoist. Séminaire Bourbaki, June 2008.
François Ledrappier: Mesures sur les espaces station aires homogeneous, d'après Yves Benoist et Jean-François Quint Séminaire Bourbaki, 2012.

References 

20th-century French mathematicians
Dynamical systems theorists
Year of birth missing (living people)
Living people
21st-century French mathematicians